Karkar Rural LLG is a local-level government (LLG) of Madang Province, Papua New Guinea.

Wards
01. Yau/Badilu
02. Matiu
03. Tarak
04. Kaviak
05. Kinim Station
06. Narer
07. Urugen
08. Bangme/Langlang
09. Gial
10. Tugutugu
11. Dimer
12. Kaul 1
13. Kaul 3
14. Mapor
15. Muluk
16. Kubam
17. Katom
18. Pain
19. Komoria
20. Dangsai
21. Biu
22. Did
23. Boroman
24. Kurum
25. Liloi
26. Marup
27. Kevasop
28. Mangar
29. Bafor
30. Kuduk
31. Bujon/Kurumtaur
32. Marangis/Mom
33. Keng/Mater

References

Local-level governments of Madang Province